Donna K. Ladd (born October 9, 1961) is an American investigative journalist who co-founded the Jackson Free Press, a community magazine, and later, the Mississippi Free Press, an online news publication that emphasizes solutions journalism where Ladd currently serves as editor. She is noted for highlighting the historical and continuing role of race in current events, for investigative reporting that helped convict klansman James Ford Seale for his role in the 1964 civil rights kidnappings and deaths of Henry Hezekiah Dee and Charles Eddie Moore, and for her coverage of Frank Melton, the controversial mayor of Jackson, Mississippi.

Biography

Early life and education
Ladd was born in Philadelphia, Mississippi. In 1983, Ladd completed her B.A. in Political Science at Mississippi State University and left to pursue a career in journalism.  She helped start The Colorado Springs Independent, Colorado Springs' first alternative newsweekly, in 1993.  After editing and then writing for the paper for several years, she moved to New York City where she wrote for The Village Voice and pursued a master's degree in journalism from Columbia University.

Family
Ladd returned to Jackson, Mississippi.  She lives with author and Jackson Free Press publisher and technology/blogging consultant  Todd Stauffer, her partner of 20 years.

Career in Mississippi
In 2001, Ladd returned to Mississippi after an 18-year absence and co-founded The Jackson Free Press.  She serves as editor-in-chief and regularly contributes op-eds and investigative pieces.  She took the name from The Mississippi Free Press, a now-defunct investigative civil rights newspaper from the 1960s.

The JFP, as it is called locally, launched in 2001 with a fully interactive Web site, with a wide variety of blogs and forums.  Ladd teaches workshops on incorporating reporting and the Web around the country.

She is one of the few female political voices in Mississippi, sometimes drawing criticism as well as  recognition for her outspoken progressive commentary on her blog.  Her investigative work on Barbour has attracted attention from national blogs.

Justice and reconciliation 
In July 2005, Donna Ladd and photographer Kate Medley joined Thomas Moore and Canadian Broadcasting filmmaker David Ridgen in a trip to Moore's hometown of Meadville, Mississippi.  They intended to investigate and call for justice for the 1964 Klan murders of his brother, Charles Moore, and his friend Henry Dee. In the paper's first story about the trip, published July 20, 2005, the JFP revealed that the lead suspect, James Ford Seale, was living in the area, although The Clarion-Ledger and other media had reported that he was no longer alive. In January 2007, the Justice Department announced that Seale had been indicted for federal kidnapping and conspiracy charges in connection with the case. Ladd's work on the case drew national and international attention, including from NPR, CNN, BBC, CBC Radio, CBS Radio, Editor & Publisher, and the Poynter Institute. In June 2007, Seale was convicted of federal charges and sentenced to life in prison.

Diversity work 
Ladd is the national Diversity Chair for the Association of Alternative Newsweeklies. She teaches annual writing workshops at the Academy for Alternative Journalism at Northwestern University every summer, a program to increase diversity in the alternative press.

Her work for racial conciliation and justice in the state have been recognized widely, including in a Glamour magazine profile, as well as by other media outlets.

Ladd serves on the board of directors of the Association of Alternative Newsweeklies and as its national Diversity Chair. She is also vice president of the ACLU of Mississippi.

Awards 
In 2006, Ladd and Mississippi NAACP chapter president Derrick Johnson were co-recipients of the Friendship Award, an annual prize given by Jackson 2000, a racial reconciliation group.
Ladd has received six awards from the Association of Alternative Newsweeklies for her investigative work and political commentary, including for her Dee-Moore series and as part of the team that investigated Mayor Frank Melton.
2005, Ladd was designated one of Mississippi's leading 50 businesswomen by the Mississippi Business Journal

References

External links 
Donna Ladd's Blog
Donna Ladd's AAN Awards
Erica Beras, "Donna Ladd: Reporting Her Face Off in Mississippi", Association of Alternative News, 13 Oct 2005

American investigative journalists
1961 births
Living people
People from Philadelphia, Mississippi
Mississippi State University alumni
Journalists from Mississippi